William Charles Stafford (August 13, 1938 – September 19, 2001) was a professional baseball player who pitched in the Major Leagues from 1960 to 1967. Stafford was a successful pitcher for the New York Yankees from 1961 to 1962, winning a combined 28 games in two seasons. He appeared in the World Series 3 times for the Yankees from 1960 to 1962, and was the winning pitcher in Game 3 of the 1962 World Series versus the San Francisco Giants. In September 2001, Stafford died in his home at the age of 63 of a heart attack.

Teams
 New York Yankees, 1960–1965
 Kansas City Athletics, 1966–1967

Pitching stats
 186 Games
 43 Wins
 40 Losses
 9 Saves
 449 Strikeouts
 3.52 ERA
 In 1961, Stafford had the second best ERA in the American League with 2.68. On October 1 of that season, he was the winning pitcher when Roger Maris hit his 61st home run of the season, breaking Babe Ruth's single-season record of 60 in 1927.
 As a kid in New York Stafford played at Athens Little League in Athens, New York.

External links

Bill Stafford at SABR (Baseball BioProject)
Bill Stafford at The Deadball Era

1938 births
2001 deaths
Major League Baseball pitchers
Baseball players from New York (state)
New York Yankees players
Kansas City Athletics players
Richmond Virginians (minor league) players
Binghamton Triplets players
St. Petersburg Saints players
Mobile A's players
Birmingham A's players
Toledo Mud Hens players
Tucson Toros players
Phoenix Giants players
Seattle Angels players
People from Catskill, New York
People from Wayne, Michigan